Leporano is a town and comune in the province of Taranto, in the Apulia region of southeast Italy. The municipality of Leporano is a little maritime town at the Ionian Sea.

The noble family of the princes of Leporano is named after the town.

Main sights
Sights include the fortress Castello Muscettola, the Saturo watch tower and the port of Pirrone.

People
 Pino De Vittorio, singer, actor
 Emidio Greco, director
 Cosimo Damiano Lanza, pianist, harpsichordist, composer
 Carlo Veneziani, director
 Jole Veneziani, stylist

References

External links
 Comune di Leporano
 Leporano Corp.

Cities and towns in Apulia
Localities of Salento